WXID-LP, UHF analog channel 49, was a low-powered JCTV-affiliated television station licensed to Marietta, Georgia, United States. The station's transmitter was located atop Sweat Mountain, north-northwest of Atlanta.

History

Since being permitted in 1988, it was W55BM until March 2008, becoming W49DE after it was forced to change TV channels due to the DTV transition in the United States (which resulted in channel 55 being auctioned to MediaFLO). The station was previously owned by the Trinity Broadcasting Network, which sold it in 2010 to Word of God Fellowship, which changed the station to its current broadcast callsign in mid October 2010.

Originally airing The Box, it later became a translator station for TBN-owned WHSG-TV. The station later affiliated with the TBN-owned JCTV network, making it one of the few TBN-owned analog stations to carry programming other than TBN. This programming was also seen on one of WHSG's digital subchannels: virtual channel 63.3, via RF channel 44.

The station was analog TV channel 55 with 11.6 kW ERP and used an omnidirectional antenna. In 2007, the station went off-air, possibly due to the use of channel 55 by MediaFLO. It obtained a construction permit to move to channel 49 with an extremely directional antenna, aimed southeast toward Sandy Springs and North Atlanta. The maximum ERP in that direction is 48.3 kW, and the nearly-circular coverage area centers on Sandy Springs, and ironically covers much less of Marietta. It also had an application to modify this permit to flash-cut as its digital TV channel (as all channels above 51 are being revoked from the TV bandplan), but the FCC dismissed this, possibly due to a request from TBN.

TBN again took W49DE silent on February 12, 2010, this time citing declining support. This has been attributed to the digital transition, but it is also due to WHSG moving much closer (right into Atlanta proper instead of the far southwest side of metro Atlanta), making a translator station unnecessary. A month later, on March 19, a deal was reached to sell W49DE to Word of God Fellowship, owner of the Daystar Television Network; the deal made it a sister station to WDTA-LD.

The station had an application to flash-cut to digital on channel 49, which would make it WXID-LD. This permit would have also moved the station's transmitter into the city at the North Druid Hills site.

On March 28, 2011, the FCC cancelled WXID-LP's license, due to the station having been silent for more than twelve months. The FCC also deleted the WXID-LP call sign from its database, and WUEO-LD now broadcasts via digital television on Virtual Channel 49 in Macon.

References

External links
previous coverage map
current coverage map
JCTV (requires Macromedia Flash to view)

Television stations in Georgia (U.S. state)
Television channels and stations established in 1988
Television channels and stations disestablished in 2011
Defunct television stations in the United States
1988 establishments in Georgia (U.S. state)
2011 disestablishments in Georgia (U.S. state)
XID-LP